Gurasa is a local bread originating from the Northern part of Nigeria, specifically Kano state. It is similar to bread except the dough is lighter. This local Northern bread is eaten for breakfast, lunch, or as a snack.

Overview 
It is made from flour (whole wheat flour or conventional one ), yeast, baking powder and egg . It is baked in Tanderu which is an hausa oven made from clay. Gurasa can either be of the local type or special one. The conventional type is the local type while the special type are made by adding other spices and garnishing ingredients. The special type are more expensive than the local type.

Origin 
Gurasa find its way to Nigeria after some Arabian travellers settled in Kano state, they make the local bread themselves in the dala local government of Kano state. Eventually it became food for the kings and rich ones, before it spreads to other northern part of Nigeria. It became so popular that the local bread is one of the affordable foods of the less privileged.

Business 
A lot of people take production of gurasa and it's distribution as their source of income in Kano state,such that  indigene from other state such as Niger travel down just to learn the business.

There is a village in Gado local government known as Gurasa village since their major occupation is production and distribution of Gurasa.

Other foods 

Gurasa can be eaten alone as a snack, with soup such as miyan taushe, Vegetable soup etc. Some also take the local bread with tea , groundnut cake known as kuli-kuli or suya.

See also 
 Arab cuisine
 Miyan taushe
 Hausa cuisine

References 

Hausa cuisine
Nigerian cuisine
Pancakes